Claudia Alejandra Ledesma Abdala de Zamora (born 14 September 1974) is an Argentine politician, currently serving as a National Senator for Santiago del Estero Province and as Provisional President of the Argentine Senate since 2019. A member of the local Civic Front for Santiago, Ledesma Abdala was governor of Santiago del Estero from 2013 to 2017, succeeding and preceding her husband, Gerardo Zamora.

Early life and education
Ledesma was born in La Banda. Her father, Oscar Ledesma, was active in local politics as a supporter of Governor Carlos Juárez. She graduated as a lawyer and notary from the Catholic University of Santiago del Estero. Her grandfather, Ricardo "Pololo" Abdala, was a physician and a prominent Radical Civic Union leader in the province as well.

Political career

Ledesma entered public service in 2003 when she was elected Citizen Ombudsman for La Banda on the UCR ticket, and in 2005 she was appointed local infractions judge. Ledesma and her first husband, Jorge Amerio, were divorced, and in 2005 she met her future husband, Governor Gerardo Zamora. She was later appointed by her husband as Director of the Provincial Motor Vehicle Registry. The couple had two sons and a daughter.

Governor of Santiago del Estero
Governor Zamora nominated his wife for the governor's race held in 2013, while he himself ran for Senator. Both won their respective races on the Civic Front for Santiago ticket, and Ledesma was elected governor with nearly 65% of the vote. 

Zamora had presided over an ambitious public works agenda in historically underdeveloped Santiago del Estero, 90% of whose US$1.8 billion budget was financed by the federal government in 2013. Ledesma continued this policy and initiated or inaugurated numerous significant projects as governor. These included among others a new building for the Provincial Legislature; the Juan Felipe Ibarra provincial office building (the first LEED certified government building in Argentina); increases in the educational budget for 1,100 new teachers and 10,000 new desks; and improvements in sewer systems and other public services. 

Some of the most notable health and social care improvements during her tenure include expansion works in 14 hospitals and a new, 150,000 ft² hospital in La Banda; a driver safety education and enforcement program that led to a 40% reduction in motor vehicle accidents; a new child nutrition program that provides probiotic yogurt to over 47,000 poor children; and housing programs that included public housing, as well as the promotion of both cooperative housing and of self-building programs that financed over 3,000 such homes in 2015.

Ledesma Abdala's term ended on 10 December 2017. She was succeeded by Zamora, who ran for a third term and won.

Provisional president of the Senate
Ledesma Abdala ran for a seat in the National Senate at the 2019 elections on the Civic Front for Santiago ticket. She won with 56.96% of the vote, and took office on 10 December 2019. On that same day, she was sworn in as the provisional president of the Senate, succeeding Federico Pinedo.

Electoral history

Executive

Legislative

References 

1974 births
Living people
People from La Banda
Argentine people of Syrian descent
Argentine notaries
Women governors of provinces of Argentina
Members of the Argentine Chamber of Deputies elected in Santiago del Estero
Governors of Santiago del Estero Province
Women members of the Argentine Senate
Members of the Argentine Senate for Santiago del Estero
21st-century Argentine politicians
21st-century Argentine women politicians